Paenarthrobacter histidinolovorans is a bacterium species from the genus Paenarthrobacter which has been isolated from soil. Paenarthrobacter histidinolovorans produces histidinol dehydrogenase.

References

Further reading

External links
Type strain of Arthrobacter histidinolovorans at BacDive -  the Bacterial Diversity Metadatabase

Bacteria described in 1954
Micrococcaceae